Wang Qing may refers to:
 Wang Qinruo#In fiction
 Wang Qin (racewalker)